The Synagogue of the Jewish Community of Barcelona, is a cultural and religious center that was built in 1954 to serve the Jewish community that lived then in the city of Barcelona. The three story building is located on Avenir street, and provides services to the members of the community as well as visitors. The center has two synagogues, one Sephardic and the other Ashkenazi. The building also has a library and a conference room.

On 18 January 2015 the temple held an homage to the victims of the Charlie Hebdo attacks in Paris. Members of different religions participated in this event. The Catalan journalist Pilar Rahola was present as well.

References

Ashkenazi Jewish culture in Europe
Ashkenazi synagogues
Moroccan-Jewish diaspora
Religious buildings and structures in Barcelona
Sephardi synagogues
Sephardi Jewish culture in Europe
Synagogues in Spain
Turkish-Jewish diaspora